Raʾs al-Jinz or Raʾs al-Junayz, located in Ash-Sharqiyyah South Governorate, Oman, is the easternmost point of the Arabian Peninsula. It is a nesting site for green turtles, as also is the beach at the local village of Ras al Hadd. It is home to a well-known turtle reserve. Important archaeological discoveries have also been made at this site, demonstrating connections to the Indus Valley in ancient times.

Bronze Age harbour

At Ras al-Jinz, since 1985, a Bronze Age (approximately 2200 to 1900 BC) harbour site has been excavated by a Franco-Italian team. There was a large mudbrick building with seven rooms. These rooms opened onto a corridor. The building seems to have served as a manufacturing workshop. There is evidence of processing of shellfish, turtle shell, flint, and the cosmetics, which was extracted from magnesium ore.

Among the finds, about 20% of the ceramics came from the Indus Valley culture. There were also ceramic fragments inscribed with the Indus script symbols.

Among the Indus wares, large ceramic jars were found in Oman. Their presence at Ras Al Jinz is seen as a clear indication of overseas trade. Thus, during the 3d millennium BCE, Oman must have been part of a great trading systems linked with the Indian Ocean. These jars as interpreted as cargo-shipment containers for dry goods being transported over water.

Remains of boats
The discovery of impressed bitumen fragments and slabs at the site provides information on procedures for reed and wooden boat construction. These objects are dated to the mid-3d millennium BCE.

The bitumen pieces carry traces of ropes, reed mats, reed bundles and other details of boat construction. Many of them are also encrusted with sea barnacles. Based on these finds, a mid-3rd millennium 12-m long boat replica was built and tested. These are the indications that this was a Bronze Age port serving the ships from the Indus Valley. Ras al-Jinz still remains an important landmark for merchant ships coming from Pakistan and India.

Metallurgy
Copper smelting and metal working workshops dating to 3000-1200 BCE have also been discovered.

Gallery

References

External links

lonelyplanet.com

Populated places in Oman
Archaeological sites in Oman